St Mary the Virgin, Mortlake, is a parish church in Mortlake, in the London Borough of Richmond upon Thames.  It is part of the Church of England and the Anglican Communion. The rector is The Revd Canon Dr Ann Nickson.

The building, on Mortlake High Street, London SW14, dates from 1543 and is Grade II* listed.

History
The first chapel in Mortlake, founded in 1348, stood on the river side of the High Street, on a site later occupied by Mortlake Brewery. The only surviving relic is a 15th-century font presented to this church by Archbishop Bourchier (c.1404–86).

The present churchyard and church were given to the parish by King Henry VIII in 1543, an event commemorated by a stone in the west front of the tower. Its inscription "VIVAT RH8 1543" is dismissed by Cherry and Pevsner as "bogus".

The 1543 building has undergone many alterations and enlargements during its long history and, of the original Tudor church, only the tower remains.  The belfry and the cupola are a distinctive feature of the tower which appears as a landmark in many historic prints and pictures of the Thames bank. The current appearance of the church is mostly the work of local architect Sir Arthur Blomfield, who built the chancel in 1885; his firm built the nave in 1905.

The vestry house dates from 1670. It was restored in 1979/80.

Internal fittings
The church's pulpit was installed in 1902 in memory of Albert Shadwell Shutt, who had been the church's vicar from 1866 to 1896.

Memorials
The earliest surviving tomb in the churchyard is that of the astrologer John Partridge, who died in 1715. There are memorials to other famous people including a British Prime Minister, Henry Addington, 1st Viscount Sidmouth (1757–1844) and three Lord Mayors of London. A memorial to John Dee (1527–1609), who lived opposite the church and is buried in an unmarked spot beneath the chancel, was unveiled in June 2013.

Present day
Together with Christ Church, East Sheen and All Saints' Church, East Sheen, St Mary's forms the parish of Mortlake with East Sheen. The parish publishes a monthly magazine, Parish Link. The church stands in the Central and Liberal traditions of the Church of England. Services are held on Tuesday, Saturday and Sunday mornings.

Mortlake Quiet Gardens are based around the landscaped churchyard and are affiliated to The Quiet Garden Trust.

Gallery

References

External links
 Official website
 Terry Roberts (2013): St Mary the Virgin, Mortlake: An Historical Guide

1348 establishments in England
1543 establishments in England
16th-century Church of England church buildings
Mortlake
Arthur Blomfield church buildings
Mortlake
Churches in Mortlake, London
Churches on the Thames
John Dee
Gardens in religion
Grade II* listed churches in the London Borough of Richmond upon Thames
History of the London Borough of Richmond upon Thames